Yoakum County is a county located in the far western portion of the U.S. state of Texas. As of the 2020 census, the population was 7,694. Its county seat is Plains. The county was created in 1876 and later organized in 1907. It is named for Henderson King Yoakum, a Texas historian.

Until the passage of a liquor sales referendum held on May 11, 2013, Yoakum had been one of 19 remaining prohibition or entirely dry counties within the state of Texas.  Voters in Denver City also approved a separate referendum to permit liquor sales within that community.

In 1965, Recorded Texas Historic Landmark number 5927 was placed at the county courthouse, acknowledging the creation of the county in 1876.

Until after 1900, the county contained primarily nomadic buffalo hunters and a few scattered ranchers. Yoakum County was organized in 1907, and the population increased to 602 because of the sale of state land deeds.

History

Native Americans

Early tribes included Suma-Jumano, Comanche, Cheyenne, and Kiowa.

The Comanches and Indians before them knew that the sand dunes that one can still see today called the Lea-Yoakum Sand Dunes and those visible around Denver City did not signify a desert. Instead, these dunes are remnants of an ancient river system that once flowed northwest to southeast through the area. Indians knew to dig beneath the surface of the sand dunes to find water. And so they frequented the sand dunes to hunt the plentiful game once there, and perform sacred rites during their encampments. Evidence of these visits to the area by Comanche, Kiowa, and prehistoric Indians before them was discovered in the 20th century by local ranchers and verified by archaeologists.

A Quanah Parker Trail arrow, installed December 14, 2011, marked Denver City as a place with historic ties to the Comanche and other native peoples who once hunted and lived in the region. In March 2015, Denver City removed and stored the arrow for eventual reinstallation at the site of a new museum.

County established

The Texas Legislature established Yoakum County from Bexar County in 1876.  The county was organized in 1907, and Plains became the county seat.  In 1900, the area had only 26 residents. One ranch in the county that year was devoted to cattle, rather than crops.

Sale of state land after 1900 brought an increase in population. By 1910, 107 farms or ranches were in the area, and the population had increased to 602.

By 1920, 109 ranches or farms in the area, but the population had fallen to 504. There were 239 farms, and the population had increased to 1,263.

The first oil well in the county gushed in 1935. Denver City benefited with a resulting boom economy. By January 1, 1991, almost  of oil had been taken from county lands since 1936.

Irrigation in the county led to more acres being planted on sorghum, cotton, alfalfa, watermelons, and castor beans. In 1982, 93% of the land in Yoakum County was in farms and ranches, and 44% of the farmland was under cultivation. Some  were irrigated. About 95% of agricultural revenue was derived from crops, especially cotton, sorghum, wheat, hay, and corn.

Geography

Major highways
  U.S. Highway 82
  U.S. Highway 380
  State Highway 83
  State Highway 214

Adjacent counties
 Cochran County (north)
 Terry County (east)
 Gaines County (south)
 Lea County, New Mexico (west/Mountain Time Zone)

Demographics

Note: the US Census treats Hispanic/Latino as an ethnic category. This table excludes Latinos from the racial categories and assigns them to a separate category. Hispanics/Latinos can be of any race.

As of the 2020 United States census, there were 7,694 people, 2,617 households, and 1,985 families residing in the county.

As of the census of 2000,  7,322 people, 2,469 households, and 2,007 families resided in the county.  The population density was 9 people per square mile (4/km2).  The 2,974 housing units averaged 4 per square mile (1/km2).  The racial makeup of the county was 70.62% White, 1.39% African American, 0.71% Native American, 0.12% Asian, 0.01% Pacific Islander, 25.48% from other races, and 1.65% from two or more races.  About 45.93% of the population was Hispanic or Latino of any race.

Of the 2,469 households, 43.40% had children under the age of 18 living with them, 68.80% were married couples living together, 8.50% had a female householder with no husband present, and 18.70% were not families. About 17.30% of all households were made up of individuals, and 8.50% had someone living alone who was 65 years of age or older.  The average household size was 2.95 and the average family size was 3.34.

In the county, the population was distributed as 32.10% under the age of 18, 8.30% from 18 to 24, 26.80% from 25 to 44, 21.30% from 45 to 64, and 11.50% who were 65 years of age or older.  The median age was 34 years. For every 100 females there were 94.50 males.  For every 100 females age 18 and over, there were 91.40 males.

The median income for a household in the county was $32,672, and for a family was $36,772. Males had a median income of $32,188 versus $19,913 for females. The per capita income for the county was $14,504.  About 17.60% of families and 19.60% of the population were below the poverty line, including 24.00% of those under age 18 and 13.00% of those age 65 or over.

Communities

Towns
 Denver City (small part in Gaines County)
 Plains (county seat)

Unincorporated community
 Allred

Politics

Education
School districts serving the county include:
 Brownfield Independent School District
 Denver City Independent School District
 Plains Independent School District
 Seagraves Independent School District

The county is in the service area of South Plains College.

See also 

 Recorded Texas Historic Landmarks in Yoakum County
 Dry counties

References

External links
 Youkum County government’s website
 
 TxGenWeb Yoakum County Memories
 Yoakum County Profile from the Texas Association of Counties

 
1907 establishments in Texas
Populated places established in 1907